Kenneth Kapstad (born 20 April 1979) is a Norwegian musician from Trondheim, known as the drummer of the band Gåte (2004–2005) and God Seed (2012–2015) and from collaborations within the bands Motorpsycho, Animal Alpha, Goat the Head and Monolithic.

Career 

Kapstad was born in Løkken Verk. He attended the music program at Orkdal vgs., two years on Sund Folkehøgskole, a year at the conservatory in Agder Musikkonservatorium and four years on the Jazz program at Trondheim Musikkonservatorium (2001–05).

After the fenomenal success within Gåte, that ended just when it started to take off, Kapstad joined Motorpsycho duo guitarist Hans Magnus Ryan and bassist Bent Sæther in 2007. He also collaborates within bands like Dadafon (2003–2004), Cucumber (2004–2005), African Pepperbirds (2004–2006), Monolithic (2005–), Goat the Head (2005–), Animal Alpha (2006–2007), Thorns (2006–), Martin Hagfors (2008–), Møster! (2010–), Grand General (2010–), God Seed (2011–), Resjemheia (2011–) and Spidergawd (2013–).

Discography 
With God Seed
2012: I Begin (Indie Recordings)

Within Dadafon
2004: My Brother's Comeback (Universal Records)
2004: Harbour (Universal Records)
2004: And So We Have to Say Goodbye (Dadafon self–released)

Within Motorpsycho
2008: Little Lucid Moments (Rune Grammofon)
2008: Roadwork Vol. 3: The Four Norsemen of the Apocalypse (included in the double DVD release "Haircuts")
2009: Child of the Future 
2010: Heavy Metal Fruit (Rune Grammofon)
2011: Roadwork Vol. 4 – Intrepid Skronk (Rune Grammofon)
2011: Strings of Stroop – Motorpsycho Live at Effenaar (limited edition vinyl)
2012: The Death Defying Unicorn (Stickman Records, Germany), with Ståle Storløkken
2013: Still Life with Eggplant (Rune Grammofon)
2014: Behind the Sun (Rune Grammofon)
2016: Here Be Monsters (Stickman Records)
2016: Here Be Monsters Vol.2 (Stickman Records)

Within Goat the Head
2007: Simian Supremacy (Tabu Recordings)
2010: Doppelgängers (Aftermath Music)
2011: Wicked Mimicry (Left Horn Records)

Within Grand General
2013: Grand General (Rune Grammofon)

With other projects
2004: No Slumber (Bergland Prod.), within Cucumber
2005: Haiglaits: Farvel Og På Gjensyn (EMI Music, Norway), with Are Og Odin
2006: Cape Point (Bergland Prod.), with Afric Pepperbirds
2008: You Pay for the Whole Seat, But You'll Only Need the Edge (Racing Junior), with Animal Alpha
2008: E.S.P. (Extended Sensory Play), with 22
2009: Men and Flies (Me Records), with Martin Hagfors
2009: Black Science (Roggbif Records), within Monolithic (Stian Westerhus)

References

External links 

Motorpsycho members
Musicians from Meldal
20th-century Norwegian drummers
21st-century Norwegian drummers
Norwegian rock drummers
Norwegian jazz drummers
Male drummers
Norwegian composers
Norwegian male composers
Norwegian University of Science and Technology alumni
University of Agder alumni
1979 births
Living people
Male jazz musicians
God Seed members
Grand General (band) members